Nahuel Iván Peralta (born 12 November 1991) is an Argentine professional footballer who plays as a midfielder for Club Luján.

Career
Deportivo Armenio were Peralta's first club, he began featuring for them in the 2012–13 Primera B Metropolitana. He made his debut on 21 August 2012 at the Estadio Alfredo Beranger versus Temperley, before scoring his first goal four months later against Flandria. He ended his first season with one goal in twenty-nine games, which preceded a further five goals and sixty-nine appearances for Deportivo Armenio in the next two years. In July 2015, Peralta was loaned by Argentine Primera División side Temperley. He stayed for 2015 and 2016 but made just one league appearance - against Defensa y Justicia in April 2016.

On 28 July 2016, Peralta returned to Primera B Metropolitana after he was loaned to Atlanta. Seven goals arrived during 2016–17, which included a hat-trick over San Telmo on 26 October. August 2017 saw Peralta leave Argentine football to play in Switzerland for Stade Nyonnais on loan. He returned to his homeland ten months later, after Stade Nyonnais secured a second-place finish in the Swiss Promotion League. Peralta left Deportivo Armenio permanently in July 2018 to join Defensores de Belgrano of Primera B Nacional. His first appearance arrived on 12 December against former club Temperley.

Career statistics
.

References

External links

Nahuel Peralta on defeweb.com

1991 births
Living people
People from Malvinas Argentinas Partido
Argentine footballers
Association football midfielders
Argentine expatriate footballers
Expatriate footballers in Switzerland
Argentine expatriate sportspeople in Switzerland
Primera B Metropolitana players
Argentine Primera División players
Swiss Promotion League players
Primera Nacional players
Deportivo Armenio footballers
Club Atlético Temperley footballers
Club Atlético Atlanta footballers
FC Stade Nyonnais players
Defensores de Belgrano footballers
UAI Urquiza players
Club Luján footballers
Sportspeople from Buenos Aires Province